Judith with the Head of Holofernes is an oil-on-canvas painting by Paolo Veronese created ca. 1575–1580. It entered the collection of Archduke Leopold Wilhelm of Austria in 1659 and is now in the Kunsthistorisches Museum in Vienna (inv. No. GG 34).

References

1580 paintings
Paintings in the collection of the Kunsthistorisches Museum
Paintings by Paolo Veronese
Paintings in the collection of the Archduke Leopold Wilhelm of Austria
Paintings depicting Judith